Asyraq Gufron Ramadhan (born 19 February 1996), is an Indonesian professional footballer who plays as a centre back for Liga 1 club Bhayangkara.

Honours

Club
PSS Sleman
 Liga 2: 2018
Menpora Cup third place: 2021

References

External links
 Asyraq Gufron at Soccerway
 Asyraq Gufron at Liga Indonesia

1996 births
Living people
Sportspeople from East Java
Sportspeople from Surabaya
Indonesian footballers
Association football defenders
Liga 2 (Indonesia) players
Liga 1 (Indonesia) players
Persis Solo players
PSS Sleman players
PS Mojokerto Putra players
Bhayangkara F.C. players